The NSK Neustadt Prize for Children's Literature is an international children's literary award founded in 2003 and given every odd-number year by World Literature Today. The prize is an offshoot of the Neustadt International Prize for Literature. Nancy Barcelo, Kathy Neustadt, and Susan Neustadt Schwartz, the daughters of Walter Jr. and Dolores Neustadt and the granddaughters of Walter Sr. and Doris Westheimer Neustadt, established the prize to “enhance the quality of children's literature by recognizing writing that contributes to the quality of children's lives.”

It is one of few children's literature awards that is awarded for an author's entire body of work—the main criterion is the positive impact of a writer's work on the quality of children's literature and only living writers are eligible. To distinguish the prize from others such as the Newbery, Caldecott, and Hans Christian Andersen awards, the Neustadts decided there would be no limitations concerning age-range, genre, or media of the children's literature under consideration.

Candidates for the award are nominated by a jury of children's literature writers, illustrators, and scholars, and the jury also selects the winner. The winner receives a check for $35,000, a silver medallion, and a certificate, in a public ceremony at the University of Oklahoma.

Winners 

To date, the winners of the NSK Neustadt Prize for Children's Literature include:

References

American children's literary awards
Awards established in 2003
University of Oklahoma